Juan Francisco Zanassi (19 February 1947  4 April 2022) was an Argentine rower. He competed in the men's coxless four event at the 1964 Summer Olympics.

References

External links
 

1947 births
2022 deaths
Argentine male rowers
Olympic rowers of Argentina
Rowers at the 1964 Summer Olympics
Pan American Games medalists in rowing
Pan American Games competitors for Argentina
Pan American Games bronze medalists for Argentina
Rowers at the 1963 Pan American Games
Rowers from Buenos Aires